The North Omotic (Nomotic) or Ta-Ne Omotic languages, belong to the Omotic branch of the Afro-Asiatic family and are spoken in Ethiopia.

Dizoid is left out in later classifications, but included in earlier ones.

A relatively comprehensive comparative word list is given in Václav Blažek (2008).

Subdivisions
The four Ta-Ne Omotic (North Omotic) subdivisions given by Güldemann (2018) are:
Ometo-C’ara
Gimira (Bench)
Gonga
Yemsa (Yem)

Numerals
Comparison of numerals in individual languages:

Notes 

 
Languages of Ethiopia
Language families
Omotic languages